Stanley "Stan" Smith (28 May 1937 – 14 November 2012) was an English professional rugby league footballer who played in the 1950s and 1960s. He played at club level for Wakefield Trinity (Heritage No. 620), and Bramley, as a wing, i.e. number 2 or 5.

Background
Stan Smith's birth was registered in Wakefield district, West Riding of Yorkshire, England, he was a pupil at Manygates Secondary Modern School in the late 1940s, and early 1950s, he worked at West Riding Bus Company , he lived on Agbrigg Road, Wakefield, he was on the committee of Duke of York ARLFC, Agbrigg Road, Sandal, Wakefield, and he died aged 75.

Playing career
Stan Smith played , i.e. number 5, in Wakefield Trinity's 20-24 defeat by Leeds in the 1958–59 Yorkshire County Cup Final during the 1958–59 season at Odsal Stadium, Bradford on Saturday 18 October 1958.

Contemporaneous description

Genealogical information
Stan Smith's marriage to Molly (née Geary) (born 1937) was registered between January and March 1961 in Wakefield district. Smith's wife Molly is the middle sister of Peggy who married Albert Firth, and Lily who married Leslie Chamberlain.

Note
During the late 1920 and 1930s there was a rugby league footballer who played for Wakefield Trinity, Leeds, England and Great Britain who was also called Stanley "Stan" Smith. These Stanley "Stan" Smith's are clearly not the same person, nor were they related.

References

External links

Search for "Smith" at rugbyleagueproject.org
Obituary - Wakefield Express
devastated-widow-of-former-rugby-league-player-appeals-for-his-ex-colleagues-to-help-investigation

1937 births
2012 deaths
Bramley RLFC players
English rugby league players
Place of death missing
Rugby league players from Wakefield
Rugby league wingers
Wakefield Trinity players